Paul Sanderson may refer to:

 Paul Sanderson (volleyball) (born 1986), Australian volleyball player
 Paul Sanderson (footballer) (born 1964), English footballer